Carabus alajensis is a species of either black- or brown-coloured ground beetle from family Carabidae,  endemic to Kyrgyzstan.

References

alajensis
Beetles described in 1896
Taxa named by Andrey Semyonov-Tyan-Shansky